Mary K. Miller is an American country music singer. From 1977 to 1980, she charted ten singles for Inergi Records.

Biography
Mary K. Miller was born in 1957 in Houston, Texas.

She began singing in her hometown at an early age. At age 15, she was discovered by Frank Sinatra at a concert in Las Vegas, Nevada. He signed her to Reprise Records. She recorded for both that label and Capitol Records in her teens, but was unsuccessful.

Record industry executive Vincent Kickerillo discovered her at a private party. Unable to secure her a contract with a major label, he founded the Inergi label in 1977. Her debut single was a cover of "I Fall to Pieces", which charted at number 89 on the Billboard Hot Country Songs charts. Miller charted in the top 20 in 1978 and 1979 with "Handcuffed to a Heartache" and "Next Best Feeling" respectively. Miller charted her last single in 1980 and has not recorded since.

Singles

References

1957 births
American women country singers
Country musicians from Texas
Living people
Musicians from Houston
Singers from Texas
20th-century American singers
20th-century American women singers